Coronel Oviedo, locally simply known as Oviedo, is a city in east-central Paraguay. It is the capital of the Caaguazú Department, about 150 kilometers east of Asunción, and was founded in 1758.

The city has a population of about 52,400 (2006 Estimate) and is the hometown of former president Nicanor Duarte Frutos.  Coronel Oviedo is an important transit point, as it lies halfway between Asunción and Ciudad del Este.  In addition, it sits at the intersection of highways Ruta 2, Ruta 7 and Ruta 8.

The moniker for the city is the "Capital of Work" or capital de trabajo in Spanish.

The original name of the city at the time of its founding was "Nuestra Señora del Rosario de Ajos" or "Our Lady of the Rosary of Garlic", as the cultivation of garlic was a prominent local cash crop and formed a significant base for trade in the city. In 1931 the government of Paraguay changed the name of the city to Coronel Oviedo in memory of Cnel Florentin Oviedo, hero of the War of the Triple Alliance. After the war Oviedo settled in Ajos live there until his dead in 1935. 

The city is the seat of the Roman Catholic Diocese of Coronel Oviedo.

Climate

See also
List of cities in Paraguay
Departments of Paraguay
Caaguazú Department

References

Populated places in the Caaguazú Department
Populated places established in 1758
1758 establishments in the Viceroyalty of Peru